Vincent Kibet (born 6 May 1991) is a Kenyan middle-distance runner, who specializes in the 1500 metres.

Personal bests
Outdoor
800 metres – 1:46.71 (Solihull 2014)
1500 metres – 3:31.96 (Rieti 2014)
Mile – 3:51.17 (Eugene 2017)
3000 metres – 7:50.54 (Rabat 2017)

Indoor
1000 metres – 2:19.93 (Metz 2015)
1500 metres – 3:34.91 (Birmingham 2015)
Mile – 3:56.09 (Boston 2017)
3000 metres – 7:44.87 (Karlsruhe 2016)

References

External links

1991 births
Living people
Kenyan male middle-distance runners
Kenyan male long-distance runners
20th-century Kenyan people
21st-century Kenyan people